Chobe Safari Lodge Airport is an airport serving Murchison Falls National Park in Uganda. The runway is adjacent to the Chobe Safari Lodge, and alongside the rapids of the Nile River.

Location

According to available maps at Google.com, the airport terminal is located in Kiryandongo District, in the Western Region of Uganda. The airport's runway stretches south-eastwards into Nwoya District, in the Northern Region of Uganda. The geographical coordinates of Chobe Safari Lodge Airport are:2°14'31.0"N, 32°08'13.0"E (Latitude:2.241944; Longitude:32.136944).

Overview
The airport serves visitors to Murchison Falls National Park and those visiting Chobe Safari Lodge that lies adjacent to the airport's single murrum runway.

Airlines and destinations

See also
Transport in Uganda
List of airports in Uganda

References

External links
 Murchison Falls National Park
 Victoria Nile at Encyclopedia Britannica

Airports in Uganda
Kiryandongo District
Nwoya District